Babice is a municipality and village in Prague-East District in the Central Bohemian Region of the Czech Republic. It has about 1,300 inhabitants.

Geography
It lies in the Benešov Uplands. The Výmola Stream flows through the municipality and supplies a system of ponds south of the village.

History

The first written mention of Babice is from 1381.

Sights
Babice is poor in monuments. There is only a small wooden belfry and a crucifix in the centre of the village.

References

External links

Villages in Prague-East District